Renato Benedetti (born November 1962) is a Canadian born and educated architect. He studied at the University of Waterloo and has practiced in London since 1989. He founded Benedetti Architects in 2016 following twenty years of partnership with Jonathan McDowell as co-directors of the multi award-winning practice McDowell+Benedetti. Celebrated projects by McDowell+Benedetti include Scale Lane Bridge in Hull and Castleford Bridge in Yorkshire.

Renato is a Built Environment Expert for the Design Council, a fellow of the Royal Society of Arts and was a founding committee member of the London Festival of Architecture. He has been a competition judge for the RIBA since 2003 and was Chair of the judging panel for The Wall, international design competition in 2016. He has judged numerous international awards and was a member of the RSA Art for Architecture Awards panel (1998-2004).

Education
 Bachelor of Environmental Studies (BES), Architecture, University of Waterloo
 Bachelor of Architecture (BArch) University of Waterloo
 RIBA part 3 University of Cambridge

Significant Buildings
 2014-2020 BAFTA Headquarters, Piccadilly, London 
 2017 Terni Bridge, Italy 
 2017 Connock & Lockie, Bloomsbury, London
 2015 Eleventh Church, Clerkenwell, London  
 2013 Brunner Headquarters & Showroom 
 2013 Scale Lane Footbridge, Hull
 2008 Castleford Bridge, Yorkshire

Practices

 2016 Benedetti Architects
 1996 McDowell+Benedetti Architects
 1989 David Chipperfield Architects

Honours, decorations, awards and distinctions

 2014 World Architecture Festival Transport Award (Scale Lane Bridge)
 2013 London Borough of Lewisham, Design Review Panel Member
 2011 London Borough of Wandsworth, Design Review Panel Member and Founding Member
 2006 World Architecture Festival News Awards Judge
 2006 London Borough of Southwark, Design Review Panel member

Teaching

 2009 Visiting Professor, Roma Tre University, Department of Architecture

Notes

References

Further reading

External links

Canadian architects
Living people
University of Waterloo alumni
1962 births
Canadian expatriates in the United Kingdom
Architects from London